The round turn and two half hitches is a hitch used to secure the end of a rope to a fixed object.  The name refers to the components used to form the knot: a round turn wraps the rope around the object (completely encircling it) and the two half hitches secure the end around the standing part.  Variations of this hitch can be made with differing numbers of turns and half-hitches; an example is illustrated below.  With additional turns, it becomes a pipe hitch.